New Mexico State Road 434 (NM 434) is a  state highway in the U.S. state of New Mexico. The route travels through Colfax, and Mora Counties, and through the communities of Angel Fire, Black Lake, Guadalupita and Mora. The southern terminus is at NM 518 in Mora, and the northern terminus is at U.S. Route 64 (US 64) in Angel Fire by the Angel Fire Airport. It includes a dangerous curve that concerns area residents and has prompted a wrongful death suit. Coyote Creek State Park is located on State Road 434 just north of Guadalupita.

Major intersections

References 

434
Transportation in Colfax County, New Mexico
Transportation in Mora County, New Mexico